The 1926–27 Michigan Wolverines men's basketball team represented the University of Michigan in intercollegiate college basketball during the 1926–27 season. The team played its home games at Yost Arena on the school's campus in Ann Arbor, Michigan.  The team won the Western Conference Championship outright. The team was led by captain Ed Chambers and All-American Bennie Oosterbaan.

Players
Samuel Babcock, Detroit, MI
Albert H. Barley, Marion, IN
Edward W. Chambers, Niles, MI - team captain, guard, and varsity letter winner
Lawrence G. Clemmons, Sturgis, MI - forward and aMa letter winner
Samuel E. Gawne, Lakewood, OH - forwards and aMa letter winner 
Frank Harrigan, Grand Rapids, MI - forward and varsity letter winner
Franklin C. Kuenzel, Grand Rapids, MI - guard and varsity letter winner
James F. Martin, Detroit, MI 
Ernie McCoy, Detroit, MI - center and varsity letter winner
John Molenda, Detroit, MI
Herman Z. Nyland, Grand Haven, MI - center and aMa letter winner
Bennie Oosterbaan, Muskegon, MI - forward and varsity letter winner
Wilbur E. Petrie, Huntington, IN - guards and varsity letter winner
Nathan N. "Nat" Rasnick, Newark, NJ - forwards and varsity letter winner
Robert D. Reason, Detroit, MI - guard and aMa letter winner
Wayne M. Schroeder, Battle Creek, MI - guard and varsity letter winner
Joe Truskowski, Detroit, MI - guards and varsity letter winner
John Dallas Whittle, Chicago, IL - forward and aMa letter winner

References

Michigan
Michigan Wolverines men's basketball seasons
Michigan Wolverines basketball
Michigan Wolverines basketball